The Khatik (Hindi: खटीक, Urdu: کھٹیک), are an ethnic tribe found in the Indian subcontinent, mainly modern-day India, Pakistan and Nepal. They are one of the most widespread community in South Asia. Khatik have a population of approximately 10 millions and are located mainly in New Delhi, Haryana, Rajasthan, Madhya Pradesh, Uttar Pradesh, Maharashtra, Telangana, Andhra Pradesh and Himachal Pradesh.

Religion 

Most of the modern-day Khatiks are Hindus and believe there origins from Khatwanga from Ramayana and revered saint Durbalnath.

Legal status

Khatiks are identified as Other Backward Class in Gujarat, Bihar, Jharkhand, Karnataka, Andhra Pradesh, Telangana and Schedule Caste in Maharashtra, Uttar Pradesh, Punjab, Himachal Pradesh, Haryana, Madhya Pradesh, West Bengal, Chhattisgarh.

References 

Indian castes
Hindu communities
Social groups of India
Scheduled Castes of Uttar Pradesh
Scheduled Castes of Delhi
Scheduled Castes of Punjab
Scheduled Castes of Rajasthan
Scheduled Castes of West Bengal
Scheduled Castes of Haryana
Scheduled Castes of Madhya Pradesh
Scheduled Castes of Chhattisgarh
Other Backward Classes of Gujarat
Other Backward Classes of Maharashtra
Other Backward Classes of Karnataka